The 1987–88 Irish Cup was the 108th edition of Northern Ireland's premier football knock-out cup competition. It concluded on 30 April 1988 with the final.

Glentoran were the defending champions after winning their 13th Irish Cup last season by beating Larne 1–0 in the 1987 final. They successfully defended the cup to win it for the fourth year running by beating Glenavon 1–0 in the final. In doing so, they became the first club in history to win four consecutive Irish Cups. To date, the feat has not been achieved again.

Results

Qualifying round

|}

First preliminary round

|}

Second preliminary round

|}

First round
The 14 top flight clubs entered in this round, along with the 2 lower league winners from the second preliminary round.

|}

Replay

|}

Quarter-finals

|}

Replays

|}

Semi-finals

|}

Final

References

1987–88
1987–88 domestic association football cups
Cup